Hrdý  (feminine form Hrdá ) is a Czech and Slovak surname. It is derived from the Czech–Slovak word hrdý for "proud."

People with the name include:
 Antonín Hrdý (1888–1954), Czech theologist, university educator and Roman Catholic priest
 Edita Hrdá (born 1963), Czech diplomat
 Ferdinand Hrdý (1872–1949), Czech Roman Catholic priest
 Gréta Hrdá (born 1932), Slovak violinist and violin teacher
 Jan Hrdý (1838–1896), Czech teacher and writer
 Jan Nepomuk Hrdý (1865–1946), Czech Roman Catholic priest
 Jana Hrdá (1952–2014), Czech activist
 Karel Hrdý (1942–2016), Czech politician
 Michal Hrdý (1959–2003), Czech caricaturist
 Olinka Hrdy (1902–1987), American designer and muralist
 Sarah Blaffer Hrdy (born 1946), American anthropologist and primatologist

Czech-language surnames
Slovak-language surnames
Surnames from nicknames